Protocadherin-17 is a protein that in humans is encoded by the PCDH17 gene.

This gene belongs to the protocadherin gene family, a subfamily of the cadherin superfamily. The encoded protein contains six extracellular cadherin domains, a transmembrane domain, and a cytoplasmic tail differing from those of the classical cadherins. The encoded protein may play a role in the establishment and function of specific cell-cell connections in the brain. PCDH17 promoter methylation is found to be closely associated with bladder cancer malignancy

References

Further reading